Nyayave Devaru is a 1971 Indian Kannada-language film directed by Siddalingaiah. It stars Rajkumar and B. Saroja Devi. The supporting cast features K. S. Ashwath, Aarathi, Dwarakish, M. P. Shankar, Dinesh, B. Jaya and Vajramuni. The song "Akashave Beelali Mele" from the film went on to become one of the biggest hits ever.

Cast

Soundtrack

The duo of Rajan–Nagendra composed the background score for the film and the soundtracks. The lyrics for the soundtracks were penned by Chi. Udaya Shankar. The album consists of four soundtracks.

References

External links 
 

1971 films
1970s Kannada-language films
Films scored by Rajan–Nagendra
Films directed by Siddalingaiah